NGC 4815 is an open cluster in the constellation Musca. It was discovered by John Herschel in 1834. It is located approximately 10,000 light years away from Earth.

Characteristics 
NGC 4815 is an intermediate age cluster. Carraro and Ortolani determined the age of the cluster to be 500 million years, based on BV photometry, which is nearly the same as the Hyades, while Sagar et al. determined its age at 400±50 million years and Kharchenko et al. at 400 million years. Friel at al. estimated its age to be between 500 and 630 million years.

There are 69 probable member stars within the angular radius of the cluster and 39 within the central part of the cluster. Five blue stragglers have been detected in the cluster, and 15 red giants are probable members of the cluster. The earliest main sequence stars are of type A0. One of the stars in the cluster region shows extremely red colour along with blue ultraviolet colour and it could be an interacting binary star. The turnoff point is at 2.6 ±0.1 .

The members show small dispersions in abundance, with the exception of Mg, which is common for clusters of rather low mass, as NGC 4815. The mean metallicity of the cluster is [Fe/H] = +0.03 ± 0.05 dex (as estimated by Frieal et al.) or −0.01 ± 0.04 (as estimated by Tautvaišienė et al.). Alpha-elements [Ca/Fe] and [Si/Fe] show solar ratios, [Mg/Fe] is moderately enhanced, [Ti/Fe] is slightly subsolar, [Al/Fe] is enhanced, and [Na/Fe] is significantly enhanced. THE CNO abundances in the cluster are [C/H] = −0.17 ± 0.08, [N/H] = 0.53 ± 0.07, [O/H] = 0.12 ± 0.09, and [C/N] = 0.79 ± 0.08.

References

External links 

4815
Musca (constellation)
Open clusters